Andrea Lewis is the first African American female pilot of the Georgia Air National Guard.

In 2010, Lewis first joined the Air Force as a reservist. In 2014, Lewis was accepted into the 116th Air Control Wing. She is a E-8C pilot.

On March 5, 2021, Lewis was honored at the "Women in the Air Force" exhibit dedicated to showcasing the history of women and their contributions in the U.S. Air Force.

References

Year of birth missing (living people)
Living people
21st-century American women
American women aviators
Female officers of the United States Air Force
Place of birth missing (living people)
African-American women aviators
African-American aviators
Georgia National Guard personnel
United States Air Force reservists